Ethmia eupostica is a moth in the family Depressariidae. It is widely distributed across inland Australia.

The forewings are white with black spots. The hindwings are white with black margins.

References

Moths described in 1985
eupostica